John Nyberg (born 14 July 1996) is a Swedish professional ice hockey defenceman currently playing for Linköping HC of the Swedish Hockey League (SHL). He was selected by the Dallas Stars in the sixth round (165th overall) of the 2014 NHL Entry Draft.

Playing career
Nyberg made his Swedish Hockey League debut with Frölunda HC during the 2014–15 SHL season. After playing his first full year in the SHL in the 2016–17 season, posting 7 goals and 15 points in 49 games, Nyberg opted to pursue a NHL career in agreeing to a three-year, entry-level contract with the Dallas Stars on 18 May 2017.

During the 2019–20 season, unable to make progression within the Stars depth chart and while in the final season of his entry-level contract, Nyberg having contributed with 6 points in 19 games with the Texas Stars was traded by Dallas to the Pittsburgh Penguins in exchange for Oula Palve on 17 January 2020. Nyberg appeared in 16 games with affiliate, Wilkes-Barre/Scranton Penguins, posting 4 assists before the season was abruptly cancelled due to COVID-19.

On 10 June 2020, Nyberg left the Penguins organization and signed a two-year contract with Brynäs IF of the SHL.

Career statistics

Awards and honors

References

External links

1996 births
Living people
Brynäs IF players
Dallas Stars draft picks
Frölunda HC players
Idaho Steelheads (ECHL) players
Linköping HC players
Mora IK players
IK Oskarshamn players
Ice hockey people from Gothenburg
Swedish ice hockey defencemen
Texas Stars players
Wilkes-Barre/Scranton Penguins players